Prunus versteeghii is a species of Prunus native to the island of New Guinea. It is a tree reaching 25m with stronglysmelling grey (sometimes brown) bark. Its herbaceous leaves are oblong to oblongovate, 10 to 15cm long and 4 to 8cm wide, having rounded to acute bases and acute apices, and two flat basal glands. Its inflorescences have triangular hairy sepals, only about 1mm long. The petals are elliptic to obovate, also only 1mm long and hairy. The flowers have 35 to 45 stamens each, with 1.5mm long filaments and 0.5 to 0.7mm long anthers. The fruits are purplishblack when ripe, have thick mesocarps, and endocarps which are glabrous inside. Its seeds have glabrous testa.

References

 

versteeghii
Flora of New Guinea 
Plants described in 1965